Bodhi Rook is a fictional character in the Star Wars franchise who first appeared in 2016 in Rogue One, portrayed by British Pakistani actor Riz Ahmed. Bodhi is a former Imperial cargo pilot who, under the influence of Galen Erso, defects to the Rebel Alliance in an attempt to steal the plans to the Death Star.

Character

Origins
Industrial Light & Magic chief creative officer John Knoll, credited for the story of Rogue One, told Vanity Fair in 2016 that he conceived the plot of the film while working as a visual effects supervisor on the 2005 film Star Wars: Episode III – Revenge of the Sith. Hearing about the development of a live-action Star Wars television series, he conceived a story, inspired by a plot point mentioned in the opening crawl of the original 1977 film Star Wars, which would eventually become Rogue One. At the beginning of shooting, Bodhi did not have a big role in the film, with Ahmed noting "He had a different name and a different relationship to the rest of the team, and he really evolved once I signed on and once I started shooting, even." Once shooting had begun, Bodhi was brought into the story much earlier and was made a more integral member of the team. His first name, "Bodhi", is Sanskrit and Pāli for "enlightment" or "awaking".

Casting
Ahmed was reported to be in talks in April 2015 by TheWrap, his casting was later confirmed by Variety in May 2015. Ahmed has said that director Gareth Edwards reached out to him for the role although it had not been fully developed yet, and Ahmed sent over 10 audition tapes in the hopes that at least one would satisfy the director, recounting in an interview with Time magazine; "He [Edwards] made the mistake of giving me his email address because I just spammed him about 10-15 different versions of this thing—doing this obsessive thing that I do. And he emailed me back at one point like, 'Hey Riz, you don't need to keep emailing me your audition. You're good. We'll get back to you. In this interview, Ahmed also revealed that he took inspiration from Dennis Hopper's performance in Apocalypse Now. In a 2016 interview, Ahmed compared Rook's collaboration with the Galactic Empire to collaboration with the Axis powers during World War II, Arab citizens of Israel and Afghan interpreters who work for the U.S. military.

Description
Bodhi Rook was an Imperial cargo pilot working on an Imperial research facility on the planet Eadu, and under the influence of Galen, whom he describes as a "great man", Rook defects from the Empire and joins the Rebel Alliance with news of a "planet destroyer". Rook is consistently doubting his abilities and reveals the only reason he defected was because Galen convinced him he was strong enough and brave enough. Director Gareth Edwards has said that out of all the Rogue One characters, he relates to Bodhi the most. Rook has strong piloting and technical skills, which helps the Rebels immensely.

Appearances

Rogue One
Rogue One: A Star Wars Story was released in December 2016, featuring Riz Ahmed in the role of Bodhi. In the film, he has just defected from the Empire after being given a holographic message of Galen Erso, father of lead character Jyn Erso. Under Galen's orders, Rook travels to his home planet of Jedha to meet Saw Gerrera, leader of the Partisans, an extremist faction of the Rebel Alliance. Rook smuggles the hologram of Galen to Gerrera, who tortures him to test his loyalty. As Jedha City is destroyed by the superlaser from the Death Star, Bodhi is helped in his escape by Cassian Andor and the rest of the Rebels. He leads them to Eadu, where they find Galen and steal the Imperial cargo shuttle SW-0608. Eventually, Bodhi participates in the final battle on Scarif, as part of a mission to steal the Death Star plans. Rook's role in the battle is to stay on the stolen ship, as he is the Rebels' only chance of escape, after being told by Cassian that he must make contact with the Rebels to get assistance and destroy the shield surrounding the planet. Rook compromises his position to do so and is killed when a shoretrooper throws a grenade into the ship, destroying it.

In other media
Rook appears in the film novelization of Rogue One by Alexander Freed.  
Rook also appeared as a playable character in the mobile turn-based role-playing game Star Wars: Galaxy of Heroes, available on iOS and Android, where he is classified as a support who works well with fellow Rebels, while slowing down enemies and making them easier to hit.
Rook is a playable Light Side squad leader in the mobile MOBA Star Wars: Force Arena, also released on the same platforms.  He can deploy supply drops to assist allies, and is paired with a U-Wing as his unique assistant, which can be summoned to bomb one particular area of the field.

Reception

Sam Adams of BBC stated that Bodhi's storyline was not handled well, saying "this part of the movie's a mess". Eric Goldman of IGN wrote "There are a couple of cases though where it feels like a bit more backstory would have helped provide motivation – most notable, perhaps, with Bodhi, whose huge decision to betray the Empire, prior to the start of the film, doesn't feel fully fleshed out."

References

External links
 
 
 Bodhi Rook on IMDb

Film characters introduced in 2016
Star Wars Anthology characters
Fictional aviators
Fictional characters who committed sedition or treason
Fictional defectors
Fictional revolutionaries
Male characters in film